Helen Moore may refer to:
Helen Moore (literary scholar) (born 1970), literary scholar and university administrator
Helen Moore (mathematician)
Helen A. Moore, American feminist sociologist
Helen Edmunds Moore (1881–1968), Texas politician
Helen Moore (nurse)  (1906–1995), matron-in-chief, Queen Alexandra's Royal Naval Nursing Service, 1959–1962
Helen Moore (1894–1963), mathematician, dean of women at Kansas State University, and namesake of Moore Hall (Kansas State University)
Helen Moore (1899–1971), American baseball coach-chaperone for the South Bend Blue Sox
Helen Moore (died 1996), wife and killer of jazz trumpeter Lee Morgan
Helen Moore Barthelme (1927–2002), wife and biographer of fiction author Donald Barthelme
Helen Mason Moore (1907–2003), headmistress of The Ellis School in Pittsburgh, Pennsylvania from 1962 to 1971
Helen Vincent Moore (1830–1903), namesake of the John and Helen Moore House in Oregon

See also
Helen Moore, fictional character in New Zealand television drama Orange Roughies
"Helen Moore", episode of television crime drama Snapped